Osvaldo Zanni (born 5 March 1955) is an Argentine field hockey player. He competed in the men's tournament at the 1976 Summer Olympics.

References

External links
 

1955 births
Living people
Argentine male field hockey players
Olympic field hockey players of Argentina
Field hockey players at the 1976 Summer Olympics
Place of birth missing (living people)